The 1950 Turkish Football Championship was the 15th edition of the competition. It was held in June. Göztepe won their first and only national championship title by winning the Final Group in İzmir.

The champions of the three major regional leagues (Istanbul, Ankara, and İzmir) qualified directly for the Final Group. İzmit Kağıtspor qualified by winning the qualification play-off, which was contested by the winners of the regional qualification groups.

Final group

References

External links
RSSSF

Turkish Football Championship seasons
Turkish
Turkey